The Golden Globe Award for Best Motion Picture – Musical or Comedy is a Golden Globe Award that has been awarded annually since 1952 by the Hollywood Foreign Press Association (HFPA).

Eligibility
Eligible films must be at least 70 minutes in length,be commercially released for at least seven days in the "greater Los Angeles area" ,and screened for the HFPA membership. The commercial release must begin during the calendar year prior to the awards ceremony, and the screening can occur no later than one week after commercial release. For purposes of the award, a "musical" is "a comedy or a drama in which songs are used in addition to spoken dialogue to further the plot." In addition, the film must have its principal dialogue in English.

Winners and nominations

1951–1957

1958–1962

1963–1969

1970s

1980s

1990s

2000s

2010s

2020s

Notes and trivia
 Between 1989 and 2004, ten animated feature films were nominated for this award and three won:
 1989 - The Little Mermaid (lost to Driving Miss Daisy)
 1991 - Beauty and the Beast (won)
 1992 - Aladdin (lost to The Player)
 1994 - The Lion King (won)
 1995 - Toy Story (lost to Babe)
 1999 - Toy Story 2 (won)
 2000 - Chicken Run (lost to Almost Famous)
 2001 - Shrek (lost to Moulin Rouge!)
 2003 - Finding Nemo (lost to Lost in Translation)
 2004 - The Incredibles (lost to Sideways)
Under the 2007 revised rules of the HFPA, animated pictures are no longer eligible in this or the category of Golden Globe Award for Best Motion Picture – Drama, instead competing exclusively in the new category of Best Animated Feature Film.

 Toy Story 2 and Borat Subsequent Moviefilm are the only sequels to have won this award without their respective nominated predecessors also winning.

 The 1961 and 2021 versions of West Side Story are the only films adapted from the same source material to win this award.

See also
 Academy Award for Best Picture
 BAFTA Award for Best Film
 Critics' Choice Movie Award for Best Picture
 Critics' Choice Movie Award for Best Comedy
 Golden Globe Award for Best Motion Picture – Drama
 Producers Guild of America Award for Best Theatrical Motion Picture
 Screen Actors Guild Award for Outstanding Performance by a Cast in a Motion Picture

References

Golden Globe Awards

Awards for best film
Lists of films by award